Edward Hyde may refer to:

 Edward Hyde (priest) (1607–1659), English royalist cleric
 Edward Hyde, 1st Earl of Clarendon (1609–1674), English historian and statesman
 Edward Hyde (died 1665), British MP for Salisbury
 Edward Hyde, 3rd Earl of Clarendon (1661–1723), Governor of New York and New Jersey
 Edward Hyde (Governor of North Carolina) (1667–1712), first Governor of North Carolina (January–September 1712)
 Edward Hyde (fictional character), The Antagonist of Strange Case of Dr Jekyll and Mr Hyde
 Edward Hyde (Northamptonshire cricketer) (1881–1941), cricketer
 Edward Hyde (Cambridge cricketer), cricketer

See also
 Edward Hide, British jockey